The Syria national under-18 and under-19 basketball team is a national basketball team of Syria, governed by the Syrian Basketball Federation.

It represents the country in international under-18 and under-19 (under age 18 and under age 19) basketball competitions.

History
The team won the silver medal at the 1990 ABC Under-18 Championship after ceding to Japan in the final. With this placement, the team led by the great player Anwar Abdoul Hay qualified for the 1991 FIBA Under-19 World Championship, where after losing 80-113 to Brazil, 99-88 to the Soviet Union and 67-80 to Yugoslavia in the basic group, they fought their way into the playoffs. In the battle for placement, they first won with Uruguay 79-78, then with Australia 76-72 and with Japan 93-79. Although they lost to China and Australia in the next two matches, they placed in a record twelfth place.

After an unexpected third place at the 2008 Asian Championship, the Syrian team qualified to the 2009 FIBA Under-19 World Championship held in Auckland, New Zealand. Although they remained winless after defeats by Spain, Canada and Australia and finished the tournament in last position, the fact that they qualified alone is a great achievement.

Competition record

FIBA Under-19 World Championship

FIBA Asia Under-18 Championship

West Asia Under-18 Championship

Team

Current roster
Syria roster at the 2022 FIBA U18 Asian Championship:

See also
Syria national basketball team
Syria national under-17 basketball team
Syria women's national under-19 basketball team

References

Syria national basketball team
Men's national under-19 basketball teams